Aneta Krejčíková (born 29 April 1991 in Prague) is a Czech actress, known mainly for her role in the TV soap opera Ulice.

Selected filmography

Films 
 Sama v čase normálnosti  (2010) TV
 Poupata (2011) 
 Láska je láska (2012)
 Murder in Polná (2016) TV
 Špindl (2017)

TV series 
 Ulice (2005)
 Cesty domů (2010)
 Obchoďák (2012)
 Případy 1. oddělení (2014)
 Rapl (2016)
 Svět pod hlavou (2017)
 Volha (2023)

References

External links
 
 Biography on csfd.cz
 Instagram profile

1991 births
Living people
Actresses from Prague
Czech film actresses
21st-century Czech actresses
Czech stage actresses
Czech television actresses
Prague Conservatory alumni